Olive Gray (born Olivia Grant; 3 December 1994) is an English actor, known for portraying Mia Stone in the children's television series Half-Moon Investigations.

Early and personal life
Gray is the eldest child of Fame Academy judges and singers David and Carrie Grant. Gray has three siblings, Tylan, Arlo, and Nathan. As a teenager, Gray was diagnosed with ADHD, and Gray's siblings also have learning difficulties. Gray studied at Queenswood School, Hertfordshire and then moved to study drama at Guildhall School of Music and Drama, graduating in 2016.

Gray identifies as non-binary, as queer, and prefers they/them pronouns.

Career
In 2005, they made their debut acting appearance in the popular television series The Story of Tracy Beaker as Alice. In 2007 and 2008 they appeared in EastEnders as Bernadette Logan, a girl who bullied Abi Branning (Lorna Fitzgerald). In 2009, they made a major appearance, portraying Mia Stone in the TV series of Half Moon Investigations. In 2016, Grant played a Yoga Girl in BBC's Fleabag. They appeared in an episode of the sitcom Uncle in 2017 as Anna. They also appeared as Miranda Keyes in the Paramount+ series Halo in 2022.

Filmography

Film

Television

References

External links
 

Living people
1994 births
21st-century English actresses
Actresses from London
Black British actors
British non-binary actors
English child actresses
English soap opera actresses
English television actresses
English LGBT actors
LGBT Black British people
Queer actors